The Phare de l'Espiguette (Espiguette Lighthouse) is a -high square tower. Built in 1869, the lighthouse is found on the Pointe de l'Espiguette, near to Le Grau-du-Roi on the Gulf of Lion in Occitanie, France.

Geography
L'Espiguette appears on some of the oldest maps: on the Barentzoom map of 1593 it is called Lapiquete and was an island. The channels in the Rhône delta are constantly changing, it was in 1570 that the Grau de Roi opened up, and the subsequent channelling of this watercourse and the silting of the land alongside it led to the fishing village of Le Grau-du-Roi, and the silting made a land bridge through to L'Espiguette. To the south of L'Espiguette is the Mediterranean sea and to the north the Lagune de la Sicarex, which in itself is a protected breeding ground for endangered avian species. The point consists of 197 ha of sand dunes, and is a protected nature reserve. The beaches are popular with tourists, and host a large naturist beach.

History

Technical details
It throws 3 white flashes four times a minute.

See also

 List of lighthouses in France
Pointe de l'Espiguette

References

External links 

 Photos
 Pointe de l'Espiguette - Conservatoire du littoral 
 

Lighthouses completed in 1869
Lighthouses in France
Buildings and structures in Gard
Camargue
1869 establishments in France
Monuments historiques of Occitania (administrative region)